Intermezzo is the seventh studio album by American progressive metal musician Michael Angelo Batio. Self-produced by Batio and featuring a wide range of guest musicians, it was released in November 2013 by M.A.C.E. Music.

Composition
When asked about the writing and recording process of Intermezzo, Batio has claimed that his goal was to create an album which "[had his] signature MAB sound, but not rehash or repeat riffs and solo passages from the past", pointing out that he "used new riffs and new ways of putting solos together that [he hadn't] used before". The guitarist also noted that, in writing the material for the album, he recorded "more than 200 different song parts and ideas" on his phone whilst touring, refining the ideas later. Batio has also claimed that he believes Intermezzo to be his heaviest album released to date.

Album title
Speaking in an interview in 2013, Batio explained the meaning of the title Intermezzo and its relevance to the album:

Track listing

Personnel
Primary personnel
Michael Angelo Batio – guitars, arrangements, production
Dan Gonzalez – engineering, co-production (track 8)
Chris Wilco – mixing (tracks 1 to 8), mastering
Bob St. John – mixing (track 9)

Guest musicians
Florent Atem – guitar (tracks 9 and 10), acoustic guitar and bass (track 9)
Dave Reffett – guitar (tracks 5 and 8)
Guthrie Govan – guitar (tracks 7 and 8)
Jeff Loomis – guitar (track 5)
Rusty Cooley – guitar (track 5)
George Lynch – guitar (track 5)

Andrea Martongelli – guitar (track 5)
Craig Goldy – guitar (track 5)
Elliott Dean Rubinson – bass (track 5)
Alex Stornello – guitar (track 7)
Chris Poland – guitar (track 8)
Annie Grunwald – guitar (track 8)
Michael Lepond – guitar (track 8)
Michael Romeo – guitar (track 8)

Maxxxwell Carlisle – guitar and production (track 10)
Tobias Hurwitz – guitar (track 10)
Ken Burridge – guitar (track 10)
Darren Burridge – guitar (track 10)
Bill Peck – guitar (track 10)
Peter Ema – guitar (track 10)
Joe Rose – guitar (track 10)
Joe Stump – guitar (track 10)

References

2013 albums
Michael Angelo Batio albums